Farrukhzad II was the 28th ruler of Shirvan. He was only a nominal king, therefore there is not much information about him.

References

1282 deaths
Year of birth unknown
13th-century Iranian people